Burckhardt Hoppe (born 10 July 1946) is a German former sports shooter. He competed at the 1972, 1976, and 1980 Summer Olympics for East Germany.

References

External links
 

1946 births
Living people
People from Salzlandkreis
German male sport shooters
Sportspeople from Saxony-Anhalt
Olympic shooters of East Germany
Shooters at the 1972 Summer Olympics
Shooters at the 1976 Summer Olympics
Shooters at the 1980 Summer Olympics